Toivo Aare (20 April 1944 Nõva, Harju County – 9 April 1999 Tallinn) was an Estonian journalist.

In 1970 he graduated from Tartu State University in journalism.

Works
 For us, for us (Tallinn, 1978)
 Five Years (Tallinn, 1978)

References

1944 births
1999 deaths
Estonian journalists
People from Lääne-Nigula Parish
20th-century journalists
Estonian male writers
University of Tartu alumni